This is the discography of k-os, a Canadian rapper, singer, and record producer. He has released six studio albums, three compilations, nineteen singles, one mixtape, and one DVD.

Albums

Studio albums

Compilations

EPs

Mixtapes

Singles

Promotional singles

Collaborations
These songs have not appeared on a studio album released by k-os.

DVDs

References

Discographies of Canadian artists
Hip hop discographies